Turris suturalis is an extinct species of sea snail, a marine gastropod mollusk in the family Turridae, the turrids.

Description
The length of the shell attains 14 mm; its maximum diameter is 2 mm; the aperture is 7.4 mm long.

(Original description) The shell has a lanceolate shape. The protoconch contains three whorls. The fourth  whorls contains ten strong vertical riblets, continuing on next five whorls, but decreasing to six on the body whorl. They cross the entire whorl, but higher at middle, forming an obtuse angle, marked by a strong revolving riblet. One strong riblet 
parallel to this is close to the suture, and one below angle. On the body they increase to over twenty of uniform size. Strong lines of growth cross these throughout, showing a deep sinus, mostly posterior to the angle. The siphonal canal is slightly twisted.

Distribution
Fossils of this marine species were found in Eocene strata in California, USA (age range: 55.8 to 48.6 Ma)

References

 R. E. Dickerson. 1916. Stratigraphy and fauna of the Tejon Eocene of California. University of California Publications Bulletin of the Department of Geology 9(17):363-524

suturalis
Gastropods described in 1894